Eoophyla limalis is a moth in the family Crambidae. It was described by Pierre Viette in 1957. It is found in Equatorial Guinea.

The wingspan is 14–15 mm. The base of the forewings is creamy white with a fuscous subbasal fascia, which is darker on the costa and dorsum. There is an orange-brown median fascia and a fuscous postmedian fascia. The termen is orange with white costal strigulae. The base of the hindwings is mixed white, yellow and fuscous.

References

Eoophyla
Moths described in 1957